George Worrall (1855–1930) was an English football player who served as the first secretary-manager of Wolverhampton Wanderers. He held many roles at the club from its formation in 1877 until 1885, including player, team manager, club secretary and committee member. 

He left the club in April 1885 and died in 1930.

References
 

1855 births
1930 deaths
Wolverhampton Wanderers F.C. managers
English football managers